Amerman is a surname of Dutch origin, or an Americanized version of Ammermann. Notable people with the surname include:

Bill Amerman (born 1953), American politician
Lemuel Amerman (1846–1897), American politician
Marcus Amerman (born 1959), Choctaw bead artist, glass artist, painter, fashion designer, and performance artist

References

Surnames of Dutch origin